Anna Rynefors (born 17 December 1974) is a Swedish musician who plays nyckelharpa and Swedish bagpipe. Together with her husband Erik Ask-Upmark, Rynefors is part of the groups Falsobordone, Dråm and Svanevit. Rynefors became Sweden's first female riksspelman on the Swedish bagpipe in 2005.

References

External links 
 

Swedish folk musicians
Säckpipa players
Nyckelharpa players
Riksspelmän
1974 births
Living people